Polish comics are comics written and produced in Poland. Very few of these comics have been published in languages other than Polish.

History 
One of the first and most famous Polish comics was Koziołek Matołek (Matołek the Billy-Goat), created by Kornel Makuszyński (story) and Marian Walentynowicz (art) in  1933. It became a cult classic, still popular today, and is an important part of the canon of Polish children's literature.

In the People's Republic of Poland the term comic (komiks) was discouraged as a "demoralising Western influence," and the terms "graphic stories" (historyjki obrazkowe) or "color books" (kolorowe zeszyty) were preferred instead; they were actually illegal and forbidden from 1947 to 1957. In modern Poland those terms have largely been forgotten, and the formerly discouraged English loanword "comics" (Polish "komiks") is now the main term for the medium.

One of the most notable series created in 1957 (and concluded in 2009) was Tytus, Romek i A'Tomek (eng. Tytus, Romek, and A'Tomek), which became the longest-published and one of the most popular Polish comic book series. Created by Henryk Jerzy Chmielewski (aka Papcio Chmiel), it centers on Romek and A'Tomek, two Boy Scouts, and Tytus de Zoo, a chimpanzee with the ability of human speech.

Over the past few years, the market for comics in Poland has grown rapidly; there is an increasing number of Polish comic books and magazines. Japanese manga has been introduced, and the first Polish manga-style publications have appeared. As throughout the world, webcomics have also become increasingly popular.

List of Polish comics

 Serce Mostu
 Czaki
 Dollicious
 Emilka Sza
 Funky Koval
 Jeż Jerzy
 Kajtek i Koko
 Kajko i Kokosz
 Kapitan Kloss
 Kapitan Żbik
 Komisarz Żbik
 Koziolek Matolek
 Lil i Put
 Mikropolis
 Przygody Kleksa
 Przygody Małpki Fiki-Miki
 Podziemny front
 Polscy Podróżnicy
 Quo Vadis
 Rewolucje
 Tytus, Romek i A'Tomek
 Wiedźmin
 Wilq - Superbohater
 Osiedle Swoboda
 Yoel
 Życie Jezusa Chrystusa

External links
 History of comics in Poland
 Polish'd Silence - Polish comics without words